Anaho Island is a rocky island in Pyramid Lake, and located on the Pyramid Lake Indian Reservation, Washoe County, in the U.S. state of Nevada.

Geography
It covers 634.43 acres (2.567 km²).

Anaho Island National Wildlife Refuge
The entire island is protected by the Anaho Island National Wildlife Refuge. The island is uninhabited by humans. Access to the island is highly restricted—no boats are allowed within  of the shores.

The nature reserve protects a colony of American white pelicans, one of the two largest pelican colonies in the western United States.

The rocky island also has breeding colonies of California gulls, Caspian terns, double-crested cormorants, great blue herons, black-crowned night herons, and snowy egrets.

References

External links
FWS.gov: official Anaho Island National Wildlife Refuge website
U.S. Fish & Wildlife Service - (slideshow of Anaho Island)

Lake islands of Nevada
Landforms of Washoe County, Nevada
Uninhabited islands of the United States